Glyphidocera is a genus of moths in the family Autostichidae.

Species
 Glyphidocera abiasta Meyrick, 1936
 Glyphidocera acuminae Adamski & Brown, 2001
 Glyphidocera adrogantiae Adamski, 2005
 Glyphidocera advenae Adamski, 2005
 Glyphidocera aediculae Adamski, 2005
 Glyphidocera aedis Adamski, 2005
 Glyphidocera alexandrae Adamski & Brown, 2001
 Glyphidocera ambrosiae Adamski, 2005
 Glyphidocera amitae Adamski, 2005
 Glyphidocera ancillae Adamski, 2005
 Glyphidocera animae Adamski, 2005
 Glyphidocera asymmetricae Adamski, 2005
 Glyphidocera arae Adamski, 2005
 Glyphidocera arakawae Adamski, 2005
 Glyphidocera arenae Adamski, 2005
 Glyphidocera audaciae Adamski, 2005
 Glyphidocera audax Walsingham, [1892]
 Glyphidocera barbae Adamski, 2005
 Glyphidocera barythyma Meyrick, 1929
 Glyphidocera basipunctella Adamski & Brown, 2001
 Glyphidocera bifissa (Meyrick, 1930)
 Glyphidocera brevisella Adamski & Brown, 2001
 Glyphidocera brocha Adamski & Brown, 2001
 Glyphidocera brumae Adamski, 2005
 Glyphidocera brunnella Adamski & Brown, 2001
 Glyphidocera burpurae Adamski, 2005
 Glyphidocera capraria Meyrick, 1929
 Glyphidocera capsae Adamski, 2005
 Glyphidocera carribea Busck, 1911
 Glyphidocera castanella Adamski & Brown, 2001
 Glyphidocera catectis Meyrick, 1923
 Glyphidocera cauponae Adamski, 2005
 Glyphidocera caveae Adamski, 2005
 Glyphidocera cellae Adamski, 2005
 Glyphidocera cenae Adamski, 2005
 Glyphidocera cenulae Adamski, 2005
 Glyphidocera cerochra Meyrick, 1929
 Glyphidocera cerula Adamski, 2005
 Glyphidocera chungchinmookara Adamski & Brown, 2001
 Glyphidocera citae Adamski, 2005
 Glyphidocera clavae Adamski, 2005
 Glyphidocera comae Adamski, 2005
 Glyphidocera contionis Adamski, 2005
 Glyphidocera coquae Adamski, 2005
 Glyphidocera corniculae Adamski, 2005
 Glyphidocera coronae Adamski, 2005
 Glyphidocera cotis Adamski, 2005
 Glyphidocera coturnicis Adamski, 2005
 Glyphidocera crepidae Adamski, 2005
 Glyphidocera crocogramma Meyrick, 1923
 Glyphidocera cryphiodes (Meyrick, 1918)
 Glyphidocera dentata Adamski & Brown, 2001
 Glyphidocera democratica Meyrick, 1929
 Glyphidocera diciae Adamski, 2005
 Glyphidocera dictionis Adamski, 2005
 Glyphidocera digitella Adamski & Brown, 2001
 Glyphidocera dimorphella Busck, 1907
 Glyphidocera dominicella Walsingham, 1897
 Glyphidocera drosophaea Meyrick, 1929
 Glyphidocera elpista Walsingham, 1911
 Glyphidocera eminetiae Adamski, 2005
 Glyphidocera eurrhipis Meyrick, 1929
 Glyphidocera exsiccata Meyrick, 1914
 Glyphidocera fabulae Adamski, 2005
 Glyphidocera faecis Adamski, 2005
 Glyphidocera ferae Adamski, 2005
 Glyphidocera fidem Adamski, 2005
 Glyphidocera floridanella Busck, 1901
 Glyphidocera formae Adamski, 2005
 Glyphidocera garveyi Adamski & Brown, 2001
 Glyphidocera gazae Adamski, 2005
 Glyphidocera gemmae Adamski, 2005
 Glyphidocera glaebae Adamski, 2005
 Glyphidocera gloriae Adamski, 2005
 Glyphidocera glowackae Adamski & Brown, 2001
 Glyphidocera guaroa Adamski, 2002
 Glyphidocera hamatella Adamski & Brown, 2001
 Glyphidocera harenae Adamski, 2005
 Glyphidocera hurlberti Adamski, 2000
 Glyphidocera illiterata Meyrick, 1929
 Glyphidocera indocilis Meyrick, 1930
 Glyphidocera infulae Adamski, 2005
 Glyphidocera inurbana Meyrick, 1914
 Glyphidocera janae Adamski & Brown, 2001
 Glyphidocera juniperella Adamski, 1987
 Glyphidocera lactiflosella (Chambers, 1878)
 Glyphidocera lanae Adamski, 2005
 Glyphidocera laricae Adamski, 2005
 Glyphidocera lawrenceae Adamski, 2005
 Glyphidocera lepidocyma Meyrick, 1929
 Glyphidocera lithodoxa Meyrick, 1929
 Glyphidocera lophandra Meyrick, 1929
 Glyphidocera lunata Adamski & Brown, 2001
 Glyphidocera lupae Adamski, 2005
 Glyphidocera luxuriae Adamski, 2005
 Glyphidocera melithrepta Meyrick, 1929
 Glyphidocera meyrickella Busck, 1907
 Glyphidocera minarum Adamski, 2005
 Glyphidocera mumiella Adamski & Brown, 2001
 Glyphidocera novercae Adamski, 2005
 Glyphidocera notae Adamski, 2005
 Glyphidocera notolopha Meyrick, 1929
 Glyphidocera nubis Adamski, 2005
 Glyphidocera olivae Adamski, 2005
 Glyphidocera ollae Adamski, 2005
 Glyphidocera operae Adamski, 2005
 Glyphidocera orae Adamski, 2005
 Glyphidocera orthoctenis Meyrick, 1923
 Glyphidocera orthotenes Meyrick, 1929
 Glyphidocera pali Adamski, 2005
 Glyphidocera paenulae Adamski, 2005
 Glyphidocera percnoleuca Meyrick, 1923
 Glyphidocera perobscura Walsingham, 1911
 Glyphidocera personae Adamski, 2005
 Glyphidocera pilae Adamski, 2005
 Glyphidocera placentae Adamski, 2005
 Glyphidocera plebis Adamski, 2005
 Glyphidocera plicata (Walsingham, 1911)
 Glyphidocera plumae Adamski, 2005
 Glyphidocera positurae Adamski, 2005
 Glyphidocera psammolitha Meyrick, 1923
 Glyphidocera ptilostoma Meyrick, 1935
 Glyphidocera ptychocryptis Meyrick, 1929
 Glyphidocera raedae Adamski, 2005
 Glyphidocera ranae Adamski, 2005
 Glyphidocera recticostella Walsingham, 1897
 Glyphidocera reginae Adamski, 2005
 Glyphidocera reparabilis Walsingham, 1911
 Glyphidocera rhypara Walsingham, 1911
 Glyphidocera rodriguezi Adamski, 2005
 Glyphidocera rubetae Adamski, 2005
 Glyphidocera salinae Walsingham, 1911
 Glyphidocera sapphiri Adamski, 2005
 Glyphidocera sardae Adamski, 2005
 Glyphidocera scuticae Adamski, 2005
 Glyphidocera septentrionella Busck, 1904
 Glyphidocera sollertiae Adamski, 2005
 Glyphidocera spathae Adamski, 2005
 Glyphidocera speculae Adamski, 2005
 Glyphidocera staerae Adamski, 2005
 Glyphidocera stenomorpha Meyrick, 1923
 Glyphidocera terrae Adamski, 2005
 Glyphidocera thyrsogastra Meyrick, 1929
 Glyphidocera tibiae Adamski, 2005
 Glyphidocera trachyacma Meyrick, 1931
 Glyphidocera umbrae Adamski, 2005
 Glyphidocera umbrata Walsingham, 1911
 Glyphidocera vappae Adamski, 2005
 Glyphidocera vestita Walsingham, 1911
 Glyphidocera virgulae Adamski, 2005
 Glyphidocera vocis Adamski, 2005
 Glyphidocera wrightorum Adamski & Metzler, 2000
 Glyphidocera zamiae Adamski, 2005
 Glyphidocera zophocrossa Meyrick, 1929
 Glyphidocera zothecuale Adamski, 2005

References

  2000: A new species of Glyphidocera from south-central Colorado (Lepidoptera: Gelechioidea: Glyphidoceridae). Fabreries, 25(4): 69-76.
 , 2002a: A new species of Glyphidocera Walsingham (Lepidoptera: Gelechioidea: Glyphidoceridae) from Costa Rica. Proceedings of the Entomological Society of Washington, 104 (1): 119-125. Full article: .
  &  1987: A new nearctic Glyphidocera with descriptions of all stages (Lepidoptera: Blastobasidae: Symmocinae).  Proceedings of the Entomological Society of Washington, 89(2): 329-343.  
  &  2001: Glyphidocera Walsingham (Lepidoptera: Gelechioidea: Glyphidoceridae) of Cerro de la Neblina and adjacent areas in Amazonas, Venezuela.  Proceedings of the Entomological Society of Washington, 103(4): 968-998.
  2002a: A new species of Glyphidocera Walsingham (Lepidoptera: Gelechioidea: Glyphidoceridae) from Costa Rica.  Proceedings of the Entomological Society of Washington, 104(1): 119-125. 
  &  2000: A new species of Glyphidocera Walsingham from southwestern Ohio (Lepidoptera: Gelechioidea: Glyphidoceridae).  Proceedings of the Entomological Society of Washington, 102(2): 301-307.
  ;  ;  & , 2004: Catalog of the type specimens of Gelechioidea (Lepidoptera) in the collection of the National Museum of Natural History, Smithsonian Institution, Washington, DC. Zootaxa 510: 1-160. 
 , 1901: Notes on the winter Lepidoptera of Lake Worth, Florida. Proceedings of the Entomological Society of Washington, 4: 446-485.
 , 1907: New genera and species of American Microlepidoptera. Journal of the New York Entomological Society, 15: 134-140.

Glyphidocerinae